Tarentola is a genus of geckos, commonly known as wall geckos. 

They are native to lands on both sides of the Atlantic Ocean; on the western side they can be found in the West Indies, while on the eastern side they can be found in mainland Africa, Macaronesia, and the Mediterranean region. However, some species such as T. mauritanica have been introduced worldwide.

Classification of genus Tarentola

The following species and subspecies are recognized as being valid.
Tarentola albertschwartzi Sprackland & Swinney, 1998 – Jamaican giant gecko (possibly extinct)
Tarentola americana (Gray, 1831) – American wall gecko
Tarentola americana americana (Gray, 1831)
Tarentola americana warreni Schwartz, 1968 – Warren's American wall gecko 
Tarentola angustimentalis Steindachner, 1891 – Canary wall gecko 
Tarentola annularis (É. Geoffroy Saint-Hilaire, 1827) – ringed wall gecko 
Tarentola annularis annularis (É. Geoffroy Saint-Hilaire, 1827)
Tarentola annularis relicta Joger, 1984
Tarentola boavistensis Joger, 1993 – Boavista wall gecko
Tarentola bocagei Vasconcelos, Perera, Geniez, Harris & Carranza, 2012 – Bocage's wall gecko
Tarentola boehmei Joger, 1984 – Morocco wall gecko 
Tarentola boettgeri Steindachner, 1891 – Boettger's wall gecko
Tarentola boettgeri boettgeri Steindachner, 1891
Tarentola boettgeri bischoffi Joger, 1984
Tarentola boettgeri hierrensis Joger & Bischoff, 1983
Tarentola caboverdiana Schleich, 1984 – Cape Verde wall gecko
Tarentola chazaliae (Mocquard, 1895) – helmethead gecko
Tarentola crombiei Díaz & Hedges, 2008 – Crombie's wall gecko
Tarentola darwini Joger, 1984 – Darwin's wall gecko 
Tarentola delalandii (A.M.C. Duméril & Bibron, 1836) – Tenerife wall gecko 
Tarentola deserti Boulenger, 1891 – desert wall gecko 
Tarentola ephippiata O'Shaughnessy, 1875 – African wall gecko
Tarentola ephippiata ephippiata O'Shaughnessy, 1875
Tarentola ephippiata nikolausi Joger, 1984
Tarentola fascicularis (Daudin, 1802) – Wolfgang's wall gecko, moorish gecko
Tarentola fogoensis Vasconcelos, Perera, Geniez, Harris & Carranza, 2012 – Fogo wall gecko
Tarentola gigas (Bocage, 1875) – giant wall gecko
Tarentola gigas brancoensis Schleich, 1984
Tarentola gigas gigas (Bocage, 1875) 
Tarentola gomerensis Joger & Bischoff, 1983 – Gomera wall gecko 
Tarentola hoggarensis F. Werner, 1937 – African wall gecko
Tarentola maioensis Schleich, 1984 – Maio wall gecko
Tarentola mauritanica (Linnaeus, 1758) – moorish gecko
Tarentola mauritanica juliae Joger, 1984
Tarentola mauritanica mauritanica (Linnaeus, 1758)
Tarentola mauritanica pallida Geniez et al., 1999 
Tarentola mindiae S. Baha El Din, 1997 – Qattara gecko
Tarentola neglecta Strauch, 1887 – Algerian wall gecko 
Tarentola neglecta geyri Joger, 1984
Tarentola neglecta lanzai Bshaena & Joger, 2013
Tarentola neglecta neglecta Strauch, 1887
Tarentola nicolauensis Schleich, 1984 – São Nicolau wall gecko
Tarentola panousei Pasteur, 1959
Tarentola parvicarinata Joger, 1980 – Sierra Leone wall gecko
Tarentola pastoria J.-F. Trape, S. Trape & Chirio, 2012 
Tarentola protogigas Joger, 1984
Tarentola protogigas hartogi Joger, 1993
Tarentola protogigas protogigas Joger, 1984
Tarentola raziana Schleich, 1984 – Raso wall gecko
Tarentola rudis Boulenger, 1906
Tarentola senegambiae Joger, 1984
Tarentola substituta Joger, 1984 – São Vicente wall gecko

Nota bene: A binomial authority or a trinomial authority in parentheses indicates that the species or subspecies was originally described in a genus other than Tarentola.

References

Further reading
Gray JE (1825). "A Synopsis of the Genera of Reptiles and Amphibia, with a Description of some new Species". Annals of Philosophy, London, Series 2, 10: 193-217. (Tarentola, new genus, p. 199).
Joger U (1984). "Die Radiation der Gattung Tarentola in Makaronesien ". Courier Forschunginstitut Senckenberg 71: 91-111. (in German).
Schleich HH (1984). "Die Geckos der Gattung Tarentola der Kapverden (Reptilia: Sauria: Gekkonidae)". Courier Forschunginstitut Senckenberg 68: 95-106. (in German).

 
Taxa named by John Edward Gray
Lizard genera